Phantom Amour is the second studio album by American metalcore band Toothgrinder. The album was released on November 10, 2017, through Spinefarm Records. This is the band's first release with lead guitarist / backing vocalist Johnuel Hasney.

Phantom Amour was produced by Taylor Larson at Oceanic Recordings in Bethesda, Maryland.

Reception
Upon its release, Phantom Amour received highly positive reviews. Justin Matthews's vocals received praise from critics, while the album's more experimental moments received a mixed reaction.

Dan McHugh of Distorted Sound praised the album's diverse sound, highlighting the electronic elements on "Let It Ride", "Adenium" and "Futile". McHugh also highlighted the title track, saying it "bursts into life with slick grungy tones proceeding at a leisurely pace sliding in and out of serene patches which ooze the restful but emotively engrossing qualities made famous by bands such as Tesseract and The Contortionist." New Noise Magazine reviewer Caleb Newton noted the album's darker and less aggressive sound and called the album "original and thoughtful". Michael Pementel, also of New Noise Magazine, noted the album's varied sound and called the band "one of the most progressive metal acts around today."

A more mixed review came from Metal Injection's Tyler Hersko. Hersko praised "Let It Ride", calling it the album's strongest track. Hersko stated that "most of the album's best tracks are frontloaded" and criticized the album's last three tracks for their "dull riffs and generally uninteresting song structures."

Track listing

On the vinyl edition of the album, tracks 1-5 make up side A, tracks 6-9 make up side B, and tracks 10-13 make up side C. Side D is an etching of the band's logo.

Personnel
Toothgrinder
Justin Matthews – lead vocals
Jason Goss – rhythm guitar
Johnuel Hasney – lead guitar, backing vocals
Matt Arsendorf – bass, backing vocals
Wills Weller – drums

Additional
Taylor Larson – production, engineer, mastering, mixing
Will Beasley – engineer 
Emir Ayouni – illustrations
The Forefathers – design, package layout
Maria Ouellette – marketing
Darren Dalessio – A&R

References

2017 albums
Toothgrinder albums
Spinefarm Records albums